Adela E. Ringuelet (born 27 March 1930) is an Argentinean astrophysicist and astronomer at the Félix Aguilar Observatory in Argentina.

She is a co-founder of the Argentinian Astronomical Association and an active member of the International Astronomical Union (IAU), where she has been affiliated with several of its commissions. As of 2017, she is a member of IAU's Division G, "Stars and Stellar Physics". Her research includes more than 100 publications in the field of stellar spectroscopy.

Born in La Plata, Argentina, she studied astronomy at the Escuela Superior de Astronomía y Geofísica with her fellow students Nora Schreiber and Elsa Guttierez. In 1958, she began working at the Félix Aguilar Observatory. She was married to prominent Argentinean astrophysicist Jorge Sahade (1915–2012), a director of the La Plata and Cordoba Observatories and former president of the IAU, with whom she published on stellar spectroscopy.

The main-belt asteroid 5793 Ringuelet, discovered by the staff of the Félix Aguilar Observatory at El Leoncito in 1975, was named in her honor. Naming citation was published on 26 September 2007.

See also 
 2605 Sahade, main-belt asteroid named after Jorge Sahade

References

External links 
 History of the A.A.A., (Asociación Argentina de Astronomía) 
 Aniversario del Observatorio Astronómico de la UNLP, images of Ringuelet, Sahade and other astronomers 
 Asteroides argentinos, list of minor planets 

1930 births
21st-century Argentine astronomers
20th-century Argentine astronomers
Argentine astrophysicists
Living people
People from La Plata